Louis Carré is the name of:

Louis Carré (art dealer) (1897–1977), French art dealer
Louis Carré (footballer) (1925–2002), Belgian footballer
Louis Carré (mathematician) (1663–1711), French mathematician